The Corpus Christi metropolitan statistical area is a metropolitan area in South Texas that covers two counties, Nueces, and San Patricio. As of the 2000 census, the MSA had a population of 413,280 (though a July 1, 2013 estimate placed the population at 442,600).

Counties
 Aransas
 Nueces
 San Patricio

Communities

Places with more than 250,000 people
 Corpus Christi (principal city)

Places with 10,000 to 20,000 people
 Portland
 Robstown

Places with 1,000 to 10,000 people
 Aransas Pass
 Bishop
 Fulton
 Gregory
 Ingleside
 Mathis
 Odem
 Port Aransas
 Rockport
 Sinton
 Taft Southwest
 Taft

Places with 500 to 1,000 people
 Del Sol-Loma Linda
 Driscoll
 Ingleside on the Bay
 Lake City
 Lakeshore Gardens-Hidden Acres
 North San Pedro
 St. Paul
 Spring Garden-Terra Verde

Places with less than 500 people
 Agua Dulce
 Doyle
 Edgewater-Paisano
 Edroy
 Falman-County Acres
 La Paloma-Lost Creek
 Lakeside
 Morgan Farm Area
 Petronila
 Rancho Banquete
 Rancho Chico
 San Patricio
 Sandy Hollow-Escondidas
 Tierra Grande
 Tradewinds
 Violet

Demographics

As of the census of 2020,  445,823 people, 153,904 households, and 105,170 families residing within the MSA. The racial makeup of the MSA was 55.4% White (Non-Hispanic white 31.5%), 3.2% African American, 0.8% Native American, 2.0% Asian, 12.4% from other races, and 25.5% from two or more races. Hispanics or Latinos of any race were 60.5% of the population.

The median income for a household in the MSA was $33,682, and for a family was $38,661. Males had a median income of $31,433 versus $21,134 for females. The per capita income for the MSA was $17,007.

See also
 List of cities in Texas
 Texas census statistical areas
 List of Texas metropolitan areas

References

 
Geography of Aransas County, Texas
Geography of Nueces County, Texas
Geography of San Patricio County, Texas